Aveba is a location in the Democratic Republic of the Congo in Ituri province, Irumu territory, Walendu Bindi chiefdom.

Populated places in Ituri Province